Demir Kapija is a small town in North Macedonia, located near the ominous limestone gates of the same name. It has 3,725 inhabitants. The town is the seat of Demir Kapija Municipality.

Etymology
The name of the town comes from Turkish Demir Kapı (Iron Gate) when the settlement was part of the Ottoman Empire, and is still called Demir Kapı in Turkish.

History

Demir-Kapija is a place already mentioned in Classical times under the name of Stenae (Στεναί, "gorge" in Greek). In the earlier dates to the Paeonian era, a fortress was built on the mountain Ramniste, on the foothills of the Demir Kapija settlement and it is still there. The ruins are one of only 3 known Paeonian structures in Macedonia unearthed, and they date from 3000 years ago. In the Middle Ages Demir Kapija was known as a Slav settlement, under the name of Prosek, while today's name originates from the Turkish reign, meaning "The Iron Gate".

The town of Prosek was used as a fortress due to its good strategic position; history and artifacts suggest this fortress was built in the era of the Macedonian dynasty around 450 BC as a look out to the canyon beyond for troop movements to the north. In the thirteenth century AD, Prosek had become the seat of Dobromir Hriz, and Strez was its well-known commander.

The former settlement was fortified by walls, and it was used to exist in the Neolithic Age. Demir Kapija is hiding numerous localities and invincible remains. The research has proved that all the pass periods have left their traces: the Paeonian, Ancient Macedonian, Roman, Byzantine, the period of Samuil, the Turkish as well as the early Christian period.

The former Yugoslav King Aleksandar Karadjordjevic had his summer home and winery built here. The winery is the oldest on the Balkans and still produces quality wines under the privately owned Agropin name. Newer wineries, like Popova Kula, have opened up additionally and paves the way for exports and economic stimulus of the region. Demir Kapija is also home to the flour mill Dekamel and has a modern farm for production of eggs known as Salmak.

Demir Kapija Today

Demir Kapija is an outdoors hеaven for sports and recreational activities. Mountaineers often enjoy hiking the area for their favorite tea plants. Formerly, the national and regional Kayak competitions were held here because of the natural rapids formed by the river into the canyon. Alpinists climb the rock towers to see the most impressive view of the canyon beyond. Trails are also made to hike to these points, as well as to the remains of the aforementioned ruins of the fortress Prosek. Possibly the most popular hike, noted in The Bradt Guide to Macedonia, is the stopping point between the 2 tunnels on the highway. 

Demir Kapija is also home to the largest mental institute in the state, The Specijalen Zavod. The Special Olympics team from this institute is well noted in football and track and field events. The continued support of foreign aid such as UNICEF and the British Embassy continues to educate families and the community and raise awareness about the needs of people with special needs.

Geography

The Vardar river makes a gorge close to Demir Kapija, while the "Bela Voda" cave is 955 m long. When passing "The Iron Gates", the road leads to the Valandovo and Gevgelija valley. This valley is under the influence of the Aegean climate. It has recorded the highest temperature ever in North Macedonia;  was recorded here on 24 July 2007. It is the most varied region in Macedonia with its agricultural products.

Important Bird Area
Demir Kapija is also a national monument of nature and an ornithological reserve, home to many rare species of birds and endemic plants. A 10,500 ha site, encompassing the Vardar gorge, Celevecka river and Krastavec ridge, has been recognised as the Demir Kapija Gorge Important Bird Area (IBA) by BirdLife International because it supports populations of rock partridges, Egyptian vultures, short-toed snake-eagles, Levant sparrowhawks, eastern subalpine warblers, western rock nuthatches, eastern black-eared wheatears and black-headed buntings.

Demographics
According to the 2002 census, the town had a total of 3,275 residents. Ethnic groups in the village include:

Transport
The town is served by the Demir Kapija railway station, with connections from Niš in Serbia to the port of Thessaloniki in Greece on the Aegean Sea (Corridor X), with Intercity services to Skopje and Thessaloniki in Greece.

Sports
Local football club FK Lozar was merged in 2006 with FK Vardar Negotino.

References

External links

 http://www.campingmacedonia.com
 http://www.rocklandcamp.com
 http://www.popovakula.com.mk
 https://web.archive.org/web/20060329040938/http://www.cybermacedonia.com/demirkap.html

https://makgeopark.mk/
 https://web.archive.org/web/20060518074401/http://www.gomacedonia.com/demir_kapija.shtml
 http://www.roads.org.mk/cor-n-s.htm
 https://web.archive.org/web/20070627072711/http://www.bhdani.com/arhiva/103/citanka03.htm
 https://web.archive.org/web/20060512220734/http://www.srichinmoyraces.org/climbing/recent/dkapija/document_view
 https://web.archive.org/web/20121202143504/http://www.mhg.ru/english/4DCA3E1
 https://web.archive.org/web/20111022134225/http://usaid.gov/locations/europe_eurasia/press/cshi_water_reconstruction.html
 http://www.maplandia.com/macedonia/negotino/#link
 http://www.crwflags.com/fotw/flags/mk-demk.html
 https://web.archive.org/web/20051214050715/http://www.moe.gov.mk/prirodnonasledstvo/Klisura%20DA.htm
 http://www.dosnica.com.mk/
 https://web.archive.org/web/20060219155351/http://www.speczavoddk.com.mk/

Cities in North Macedonia
Demir Kapija Municipality
Important Bird Areas of North Macedonia